Etosha Commando was a light infantry regiment of the South West Africa Territorial Force. It formed part of the Area Force Units as well as the Territorial Reserve.

History

Origin
Etosha Commando was one of 26 Area Force Units, similar to the localised territorial force concept of area bound commandos in South Africa. These units were set in particular sectors of South West Africa mainly from the farming community.

Operations

Disbandment
This unit, along with all other South West Africa Territorial Force units was disbanded with the independence of Namibia from South Africa and was announced around December 1988.

Leadership

References

See also 
 South African Commando System

Infantry regiments of South Africa
South African Commando Units
Military units and formations disestablished in 1989